Sverdlovskoye is a rural locality (a selo) and the administrative center of Sverdlovsky Selsoviet, Khabarsky District, Altai Krai, Russia. The population was 713 as of 2013. It was founded in 1900. There are 10 streets.

Geography 
Sverdlovskoye is located 37 km south of Khabary (the district's administrative centre) by road. Dobrovolshchina is the nearest rural locality.

References 

Rural localities in Khabarsky District